The Kansas African American Legislative Caucus, formerly known as the Kansas Black Legislative Caucus, is an American political and educational organization. The Caucus is composed of seven African Americans elected to the Kansas Legislature.

History
The Caucus was organized in March 1975 to foster greater participation of minority groups in the political process and enhance their awareness of critical political issues. Founding members of the Caucus include: Representatives Norman E. Justice, Clarence C. Love, Theo Cribbs, Eugene Anderson and William K. Marshall and Senator Billy Q. McCray.

Priorities

Current membership
List of officers:

Members
Kansas State Sen. Oletha Faust-Goudeau (D-Wichita)
Kansas State Sen. David Haley (D-Kansas City)
Kansas State Rep. Barbara Ballard (D-Lawrence)
Kansas State Rep. Gail Finney (D-Wichita)
Kansas State Rep. Broderick Henderson (D-Kansas City)
Kansas State Rep. Roderick Houston (D-Wichita)
Kansas State Rep. Valdenia Winn (D-Kansas City)

See also
 History of African Americans in Kansas

Notes

African-American history of Kansas
Kansas Legislature
State Legislative Black Caucuses
 
1975 establishments in Kansas